Agatha Rosenius (10 September 1814 – 29 August 1874) was a Swedish hymnwriter.

Biography 
She was born Agatha Ulrika Lindberg to county official Erik Lindberg and Elisabeth Catharina (née Nordlund) in Grisbacka, today part of Umeå. She found an active Christian faith at a young age – a belief not shared by her parents and which led to conflict in the home.

Preacher Carl Olof Rosenius later visited her hometown, encouraging her in her faith. They both described feeling that God had brought them their future spouse. After corresponding for a time, and after eventually receiving her parents' approval, the two were married on 2 August 1843 in Umeå by priest A. A. Grafström. She was described by her husband as being satisfied with simple living and not caring for worldly interests, and by others as shy but unforgettable. The couple was known for their hospitality, often inviting fellow revivalists who were traveling to stay with them.

Rosenius was known for her musical and poetic ability and regularly played the piano. She was friends with fellow hymnwriters Lina Sandell and Charlotte af Tibell. Upon her death in 1874, both friends wrote tribute poems to her memory. Charlotte af Tibell wrote:

Rosenius herself composed a number of songs with religious themes, some of which were published in the Swedish Baptist hymnal  and some in other hymnals; however, her work was not published in the Church of Sweden's hymnal Den svenska psalmboken apart from the Swedish Evangelical Mission's .

Hymns 

  (1920, number 423 under the heading .
 , translated from English lyrics by C. M. Youngquist (1920, number 313 under the heading ,  1935)
 "" (1847)

References

Notes

Sources

External links 

1814 births
1874 deaths
Swedish hymnwriters
19th-century Swedish writers
People from Umeå